Kennington Football Club is a football club based in the Kennington suburb of Ashford in Kent, England.

History
The club was established in the 1880s. They became members of the Ashford & District league, in which they played until moving up to the Premier Division of the Eastern Section of the Kent County League in 1989. The club won the Eastern Section Premier Cup and the Premier Division at the first attempt, earning promotion to the Senior Division. When the league was restructured in 1992, the club were placed in Division One (East).

In 1997–98, Kennington were Division One (East) runners-up. They went on to win the division the following season, but were not promoted to the Premier Division. After finishing as runners-up in the division again in 1999–2000 and 2000–01, the club won the division for a second time in 2001–02 and were promoted to the Premier Division. However, in 2003–04 they finished bottom of the Premier Division and were relegated back to Division One (East). In 2008–09 the club won the Weald of Kent Trophy.

League restructuring saw Kennington placed in Division One in 2011. They won the Bill Manklow Inter Regional Challenge Cup in 2012–13, before being moved back into Division One (East) when it was reintroduced at the end of the season. The club were runners-up in the division in 2014–15, and were promoted to the Premier Division. In 2017–18 they were Premier Division champions, earning promotion to Division One of the Southern Counties East League. In 2019–20 the club were top of Division One when the season was abandoned due to the COVID-19 pandemic. In 2021 the club were promoted to the Premier Division based on their results in the abandoned 2019–20 and 2020–21 seasons.

Season-by-season

Ground
In 2012 Kennington moved to the Julie Rose Stadium. After briefly returning to their Sandyacres ground in 2018, later in the year they relocated to Ashford United's Homelands ground.

Honours
Kent County League
Premier Division champions 2017–18
Division One (East) champions 1998–99, 2001–02
Eastern Section Premier Division champions 1989–90
Weald of Kent Trophy winners 2008–09
Eastern Section Premier Cup winners 1989–90
Bill Manklow Inter Regional Challenge Cup winners 2012–13

Records
Highest league position: 3rd in the Southern Counties East League Division One, 2018–19
Best FA Cup performance: Extra preliminary round, 2020–21
Best FA Vase performance: Third round, 2020–21

References

External links
Official website

Football clubs in England
Football clubs in Kent
1880s establishments in England
Association football clubs established in the 19th century
Kent County League
Southern Counties East Football League